Dactylastele duplicata is a species of sea snail, a marine gastropod mollusk in the family Calliostomatidae.

Description
The turreted-conic shell is imperforate. The whorls are convex. They are ornamented with granose cinguli, with two larger more prominent cinguli at the base of the shell. The interstices are longitudinally striate. A body whorl is subrounded, its base a little convex. It is sculptured with granose cinguli. The aperture is subrotund. The lip is lirate within. The columella terminates in a tubercle at its base.

Distribution
This marine species occurs off Western Australia, Queensland and New South Wales.

References

 Cotton, B.C., 1959. South Australian Mollusca. Archaeogastropoda. Govt. Printer, Adelaide
 Marshall, B.A. (1995), Calliostomatidae (Gastropoda: Trochoidea) from New Caledonia, the Loyalty Islands and the northern Lord Howe Rise; Mém. Mus. natn. Hist. nat. 167 : 381–458

External links

duplicata
Gastropods described in 1851